The Swahili people comprise mainly Bantu, Afro-Arab and Comorian ethnic groups inhabiting the Swahili coast, an area encompassing the Zanzibar archipelago and mainland Tanzania's seaboard, littoral Kenya, northern Mozambique, the Comoros Islands, southwestern Somalia and Northwest Madagascar. The original Swahili distinguished themselves from other Bantu peoples by self-identifying as Waungwana (the civilised ones). In certain regions (e.g. Lamu Island), this differentiation is even more stratified in terms of societal grouping and dialect, hinting to the historical processes by which the Swahili have coalesced over time. More recently, however, Swahili identity extends to any person of African descent who speaks Swahili as their first language, is Muslim and lives in a town on the main urban centres of most of modern-day Tanzania and coastal Kenya, northern Mozambique and the Comoros, through a process of swahilization.

Swahili people speak the Swahili language. Swahili people's endonym for themselves is Waungwana, which means "the civilized ones." Modern Standard Swahili is derived from the Kiunguja dialect of Zanzibar. Like many other world languages, Swahili has borrowed a large number of words from foreign languages, particularly administrative terms from Arabic, but also words from Portuguese, Hindi and German. Other, older dialects like Kimrima and Kitumbatu have far fewer Arabic loanwords, indicative of the language's fundamental Bantu nature. Kiswahili served as coastal East Africa's lingua franca and trade language from the ninth century onward. Zanzibari traders' intensive push into the African interior from the late eighteenth century induced the adoption of Swahili as a common language throughout much of East Africa. Thus, Kiswahili is the most spoken African language, used by far more than just the Waswahili themselves.

Definition 

The Swahili people originate from Bantu inhabitants of the coast of Southeast Africa, in Kenya, Tanzania and Mozambique. These Bantu-speaking agriculturalists settled the coast at the outset of the first millennium. Archaeological finds at Fukuchani, on the north-west coast of Zanzibar, indicate a settled agricultural and fishing community from the 6th century CE at the latest. The considerable amount of daub found indicates timber buildings, and shell beads, bead grinders, and iron slag have been found at the site. There is evidence for limited engagement in long-distance trade: a small amount of imported pottery has been found, less than 1% of total pottery finds, mostly from the Gulf and dated to the 5th to 8th century. The similarity to contemporary sites such as Mkokotoni and Dar es Salaam indicate a unified group of communities that developed into the first centre of coastal maritime culture. The coastal towns appear to have been engaged in Indian Ocean trade at this early period, and trade rapidly increased in importance and quantity between the mid-8th and the 11th century.

Some Swahili claim a Shirazi origin. This forms the basis of the Shirazi era origin myth that proliferated along the coast at the turn of the millennium. Modern academics reject the authenticity of the primarily Persian origin claim. They point to the relative rarity of Persian customs and speech, lack of documentary evidence of Shia Islam in the Muslim literature on the Swahili Coast, and instead a historic abundance of Sunni Arab-related evidence. The documentary evidence, like the archaeological, "for early Persian settlement is likewise completely lacking.". The most likely origin for the stories about the Shirazi is from Muslim inhabitants of the Lamu archipelago who moved south in the 10th and 11th centuries. They brought with them a coinage tradition and localized form of Islam. These Africans migrants seem to have developed a concept of Shirazi origin as they moved further southwards, near Malindi and Mombasa, along the Mrima coast. The longstanding trade connections with the Persian gulf gave credence to these myths. In addition, because most Muslim societies are patrilineal, one can claim distant identities through paternal lines despite phenotypic and somatic evidence to the contrary. The so-called Shirazi tradition represents the arrival of Islam in these eras, one reason it has proven so long lasting. Extant mosques and coins demonstrate that the "Shirazi" were not Middle Eastern immigrants, but northern Swahili Muslims. They moved south, founding mosques, introducing coinage and elaborately carved inscriptions and mihrabs. They should be interpreted as indigenous African Muslims who played the politics of the Middle East to their advantage. Some still use this foundation myth a millennium later to assert their authority, even though the myth's context has long been forgotten. The Shirazi legend took on new importance in the 19th century, during the period of Omani domination. Claims of Shirazi ancestry were used to distance locals from Arab newcomers, since Persians are not viewed as Arabs but still have an exemplary Islamic pedigree. The emphasis that the Shirazi came very long ago and intermarried with indigenous locals ties this claim to the creation of convincing indigenous narratives about Swahili heritage without divorcing it from the ideals of being a maritime-centred culture.

There are two main theories about the origins of the Shirazi subgroup of the Swahili people. One thesis based on oral tradition states that immigrants from the Shiraz region in southwestern Iran directly settled various mainland ports and islands on the eastern Africa seaboard beginning in the tenth century. By the time of the Persian settlement in the area, the earlier occupants had been displaced by incoming Bantu and Nilotic populations. More people from different parts of the Persian Gulf also continued to migrate to the Swahili coast over several centuries thereafter, and these formed the modern Shirazi. The second theory on Shirazi origins also posits that they came from Persia, but first settled in the Horn of Africa. In the twelfth century, as the gold trade with the distant entrepot of Sofala on the Mozambique seaboard grew, the settlers are then said to moved southwards to various coastal towns in Kenya, Tanzania, northern Mozambique and the Indian Ocean islands. By 1200 CE, they had established local sultanates and mercantile networks on the islands of Kilwa, Mafia and Comoros along the Swahili coast, and in northwestern Madagascar.

The modern Swahili people speak the Swahili language as a mother tongue, which belongs to the Bantu branch of the Niger-Congo family. The language contains loan words from Arabic.

Religion 

Islam established its presence on the Southeast African coast from around the 9th century, when Bantu traders settling on the coast tapped into the Indian Ocean trade networks. The Swahili people follow the Sunni denomination of Islam.

Large numbers of Swahili undertake the Hajj and Umrah from Tanzania, Kenya, and Mozambique. Traditional Islamic dress such as the jilbab and thob are also popular among the Swahili. The Swahili also are known for their use of divination, which has adopted some syncretic features from underlying traditional indigenous beliefs, they believe in djinn and many men wear protective amulets with verses from the Qu'ran.

Divination is practiced through Qur'anic readings. Often the diviner incorporates verses from the Qur'an into treatments for certain diseases. On occasion, he instructs a patient to soak a piece of paper containing verses of the Qur'an in water. With this ink infused water, literally containing the word of Allah, the patient will then wash his body or drink it to cure himself of his affliction. It is only prophets and teachers of Islam who are permitted to become medicine men among the Swahili.

Language 

The Swahili speak as their native tongue the Swahili language, which is a member of the Bantu subgroup of the Niger-Congo family. Its closest relatives include Comorian spoken on the Comoros Islands, and the Mijikenda language of the Mijikenda people in Kenya.

With its original speech community centred on Zanzibar and the coastal parts of Kenya and Tanzania, a seaboard referred to as the Swahili Coast, Swahili became the tongue of the urban class in the African Great Lakes region, and eventually went on to serve as a lingua franca during the post-colonial period.

Genetics 
In 2022, DNA was extracted from medieval and early modern coastal towns along the Swahili Coast. Before 1500 CE, the inhabitants carried both African, as well as Asia/Near-East ancestry which was mainly Persian-related. This is consistent with the narrative of the Kilwa Chronicle. After this time, Arabian ancestry becomes more prevalent, which correlates with the archaeological and historical record of interactions with Southern Arabia (Oman).

Economy 
For centuries the Swahili depended greatly on trade from the Indian Ocean. The Swahili have played a vital role as middle man between southeast, central and South Africa, and the outside world. Trade contacts have been noted as early as 100 CE by early Roman writers who visited the Southeast African coast in the 1st century. Trade routes extended from Kenya to Tanzania into modern day Congo, along which goods were brought to the coasts and were sold to Arab, Indian, and Portuguese traders. Historical and archaeological records attest to Swahilis being prolific maritime merchants and sailors who sailed the Southeast African coastline to lands as far away as Arabia, Persia, Madagascar, India and even China. Chinese pottery and Arabian beads have been found in the ruins of Great Zimbabwe. During the apogee of the Middle Ages, ivory and slaves became a substantial source of revenue. Many captives of the Portuguese sold in Zanzibar ended up in Brazil, which was then a Portuguese colony. Swahili fishermen of today still rely on the ocean to supply their primary source of income. Fish is sold to their inland neighbours in exchange for products of the interior.

Although most Swahili live with living standards far below that of upper hierarchy of the wealthiest nations, the Swahili are generally considered a relatively economically powerful group due to their history of trade. They are comparatively well-off; According to the United Nations, the island of Zanzibar has a 25% higher per capita GDP than the rest of Tanzania. This economic influence has led to the continued spread of their culture and language throughout East Africa.

Architecture 
Thought by many early scholars to be essentially of Arabic or Persian style and origin, some contemporary academics are suggesting that archaeological, written, linguistic, and cultural evidence might suggest an African genesis which would be accompanied only later by an enduring Arabic and Islamic influences in the form of trade and an exchange of ideas. Upon visiting Kilwa in 1331, the great Berber explorer Ibn Battuta was impressed by the substantial beauty that he encountered there. He describes its inhabitants as "Zanj, jet-black in colour, and with tattoo marks on their faces", and notes that "Kilwa is a very fine and substantially built town, and all its buildings are of wood" (his description of Mombasa was essentially the same). Kimaryo points out that the distinctive tattoo marks are common among the Makonde. Architecture included arches, courtyards, isolated women's quarters, the mihrab, towers, and decorative elements on the buildings themselves. Many ruins may still be observed near the southern Kenyan port of Malindi in the Gede ruins (the lost city of Gede/Gedi).

Notable People 
 Abdisalam Ibrahim
 Charles Okere
 Jamal Mohamed
 Mohamed Husseini
 Musa Mudde
 Saad Musa
 Shabani Nonda
 Yussuf Poulsen

See also 
 Swahili language
 Swahililand
 Swahili architecture
 Swahili culture
 Comorian society

References

External links 

 
 The Story of Africa: The Swahili — BBC World Service
 Swahili Culture
 
 F. Le Guennec-Coppens et D. Parkin, Autorité et pouvoir chez les Swahili, Karthala, 1998, p. 262

 
 
Islam in Tanzania
Bantu peoples
Ethnic groups in Kenya
Ethnic groups in Tanzania
Ethnic groups in Mozambique
Ethnic groups in Oman